Abdul "Oscar" Umar is a Ghanaian footballer.

Career 
Umar played four years of college soccer at Villanova University between 2011 and 2014. Following his time at Villanova, Umar coached soccer at Cabrini University and played with Premier Development League side Ocean City Nor'easters in 2016, and National Premier Soccer League side West Chester United in 2017.

Umar signed with United Soccer League side Richmond Kickers on 13 July 2017.

Umar moved to USL Championship side Saint Louis FC ahead of their 2019 season. Saint Louis FC folded following the 2020 USL Championship season.

References 

1993 births
Ghanaian footballers
Living people
Villanova Wildcats men's soccer players
Ocean City Nor'easters players
Richmond Kickers players
Saint Louis FC players
USL League Two players
USL Championship players
Association football midfielders
People from Tamale, Ghana